Muhammad Ben Aras (born 13 September 1930) is a Pakistani long-distance runner. He competed in the marathon at the 1952 Summer Olympics.

References

External links

1930 births
Possibly living people
Athletes (track and field) at the 1952 Summer Olympics
Pakistani male long-distance runners
Pakistani male marathon runners
Olympic athletes of Pakistan
Place of birth missing (living people)